The men's tournament of Beach volleyball at the 2013 Summer Universiade in Kazan was held between July 7–13.

Medalists

Preliminary round

Group I

|}

Group J

|}

Group K

|}

Group L

|}

Group M

|}

Group N

|}

Group O

|}

Group P

|}

Bracket

Winners Brackets

Top half

Bottom half

Losers Bracket

13th-24th Place

7th-12th place

5th-6th place

Finals

References
Draw

2013 Summer Universiade events
Beach volleyball at the Summer Universiade